H. Ramachandra Shastry (1906 – 1992) was an Indian Carnatic flautist. He belonged to the bani (music school) of Sarabha Sastri and learned music from Palladam Sanjiva Rao, a direct disciple of Sastri].

Shastry taught Carnatic flute at Kalakshetra until 1992. G. S. Rajan, Ludwig Pesch and T Sashidhar are some of his disciples.

References
Biography of H. Ramachandra Shastry
The Oxford Illustrated Companion to South Indian Classical Music. New Delhi: Oxford University Press, 2009, p. 103, fig. 5 (Carnatic ensemble, Madras 1937)
A Garland (Biographical Dictionary) of Carnatic Composers and Musicians. Bombay: Bharatiya Vidya Bhavan, 1990, pp. 228–9

1906 births
1992 deaths
Carnatic instrumentalists
Venu players
Indian flautists
20th-century Indian musicians
20th-century flautists